Antonio Mollica is an Italian filmmaker. Credited as Tony Mulligan, he directed his first western film in 1967 named Born to Kill. With Manuel Esteba and José Ulloa he penned Veinte pasos para la muerte (1970), and was credited as Ted Mulligan.

Filmography

References

External links
 

Date of birth missing
Italian film directors
Italian film producers
Italian male screenwriters
Possibly living people